Not a Word About Love (German: Kein Wort von Liebe) is a 1937 Czechoslovak-German romantic comedy film directed by Miroslav Cikán and Alwin Elling and starring Ellen Schwanneke, Rolf Wanka and Richard Romanowsky. It is the German-language version of Poslíček lásky.

Cast
 Ellen Schwanneke as Steffie Leutner - Stenotypistin
 Rolf Wanka as 	Hubert Kersten - Modeschöpfer
 Richard Romanowsky as 	Erasmus Stössel - Bürovorsteher
 Margit Symo as 	Stascha
 Hans Hermann Schaufuß as 	Leutner / Uhrmacher / Steffis Vater
 Erich Fiedler as 	Treff - Reporter
 Walter Szurovy as 	Fred Curry
 Marion Wünsche as 	Gerda - Steffis Freundin

References

Bibliography
 Waldman, Harry. Nazi Films in America, 1933-1942. McFarland, 2008.

External links 
Not a Word About Love at the Internet Movie Database

1937 films
German romantic comedy films
Films of Nazi Germany
Czechoslovak romantic comedy films
1930s romance films
Films directed by Miroslav Cikán
Czech romantic comedy films
1930s German-language films
Czechoslovak black-and-white films
Czechoslovak multilingual films
1937 multilingual films
1930s Czech films
Films directed by Alwin Elling